Los Angeles City Council District 9 is one of the 15 districts of the Los Angeles City Council.  The Ninth District encompasses much of South Los Angeles and the western section of Downtown Los Angeles which includes L.A. Live, Crypto.com Arena, and the Los Angeles Convention Center. The current council member is Curren Price.

Geography

Modern

The 9th formerly covered the entire core of Downtown Los Angeles, before redistricting divided it between the 9th and the 14th District.  Most of Downtown is now in the nearby 14th City Council district, represented by Jose Huizar.  The 9th district's boundary continues several miles to the south and ends just north of Watts.

See official city map outlining District 9.

Historic

A new city charter effective in 1925 replaced the former "at large" voting system for a nine-member council with a district system with a 15-member council. Each district was to be approximately equal in population, based upon the voting in the previous gubernatorial election; thus redistricting was done every four years. (At present, redistricting is done every ten years, based upon the preceding U.S. census results.) The numbering system established in 1925 for City Council districts began with No. 1 in the north of the city, the San Fernando Valley, and ended with No. 15 in the south, the Harbor area.

The district has occupied the same general area since it was formed in 1925. With the city's changes in population, though,  its western boundary has moved farther west to include much of Downtown.

The rough boundaries or descriptions have been as follows:

1925: North, Alhambra Avenue; south, Vernon city line; east, Indiana Street; west, Alameda Avenue; with the Los Angeles River bisecting it.

1926: Hollenbeck or Boyle Heights.

'1928: Same as 1925, but the western boundary is moved west to Hill Street.

1932–33: North, Alhambra Avenue; south, 25th Street; east, Indiana Avenue; west, Figueroa Street.

1964: All of the downtown area.

1990: Downtown, Little Tokyo, Chinatown and "about 70  blocks south of downtown."

1991: From Chinatown on the north to 84th Street on the south.

Officeholders

See also

 List of Los Angeles municipal election returns

References

External links
 Official Los Angeles City Council District 9 website

LACD09
Downtown Los Angeles
South Los Angeles
Exposition Park (Los Angeles neighborhood)
University Park, Los Angeles